Airey may refer to:

People
 Airey Neave (1916–1979), a British politician
 Carl Airey (born 1965), a professional football player from Yorkshire
 Dawn Airey (born 1960), British television executive
 Deidre Airey (1926 - 2002), ceramic artist from New Zealand
 Diana Neave, Baroness Airey of Abingdon (1919–1992), a British life peer and the widow of Airey Neave
 Diane Airey (born 1943), former Australian politician
 Don Airey (born 1948), a keyboardist in the band Deep Purple
 Edwin Airey (1878–1955), a Lord Mayor of Leeds
 Frank Airey (1887–?), footballer who played in The Football League for Gainsborough Trinity. He also played for Trinity Institute
 George Airey (1761–1833), English general
 George Airey Kirkpatrick (1841–1899), a politician from Ontario
 Harriett Airey, pen name of Mary Darwall (1738–1825)
 Henry Parke Airey (1842–1911), Australian colonial soldier
 James Airey (disambiguation)
 Jim Airey (born 1941), Australian motorcycle speedway rider
 John Airey (died 1893), politician in colonial Australia, member of the New South Wales Legislative Council 1847 to 1848
 John Robinson Airey (1868–1937), British schoolteacher, mathematician and astrophysicist
 Josephine Airey (1844–1899), Irish-born American prostitute, madam, and proprietor of brothels, dance halls, a variety theatre, and saloons 
 Paul W. Airey (1923–2009), an adviser to the American Secretary of the Air Force
 Peter Airey (1865–1950), Australian legislator and writer
 Phil Airey (born 1991), English footballer, Newcastle United
 Richard Airey, 1st Baron Airey (1803–1881), a British Army general
 Robert Airey (1874–1933), English cricketer and Army officer 
 Stuart Airey (cricketer) (born 1983), English cricketer 
 Terence Airey (1900–1983), a British Army officer

Places
 Airey, Maryland, a populated place in Dorchester County, Maryland, U.S.
 Aireys Inlet, Victoria, a small coastal inlet and town in Victoria, Australia

Other uses
 Airey, a colloquial term for area or areaway

See also 
 Airy (disambiguation)
 Area, in architecture
 Aerie, an eagle's, hawk's, or falcon's nest
 Mount Airy (disambiguation)